Rocas Alijos, or Escollos Alijos are a series of tiny, steep, uninhabited, and barren volcanic islets or above-water (as well as below-water) rocks in the Pacific Ocean at .

The group consists of three principal rocks and numerous smaller ones.
The rocks in between those are either submerged or so low that they are barely visible among the heavily breaking waves.

The rocks have been known since the early Spanish history of Mexico; they can be found on a map from 1598. Others have described their official discovery as coming in 1605. The first description is from 1704, by pirate John Clipperton. The first exact description was made by a Spanish sailor in 1791. South Rock was climbed for the first time in 1990 by an expedition (October 31 through November 7, 1990) under the leadership of Robert Schmieder, who edited a monograph about the rocks.

The group is located at the transition zone between two major biologic provinces, at a latitude where the Pacific Current turns westward to form the North Pacific trans-oceanic current. The rocks are nesting sites of many seabirds.

The two other Mexican island groups in the Pacific Ocean that are not on the continental shelf are Guadalupe Island and Revillagigedo Islands.

Fauna
The breeding marine avifauna of Alijos Rocks currently consists of Leach's storm-petrel (a presumed breeder, probably a few pairs), red-billed tropicbird (14 birds), masked booby (100), and sooty tern (250). The magnificent frigatebird is a regular winter visitor but probably does not breed. The Laysan albatross is currently an annual visitor to Alijos Rocks during its winter breeding season, and may start to nest there in the near future.

References

External links
Radio enthusiast's description
more detailed description in German
sailing directions
Rocas Alijos: Scientific Results from the Cordell Expeditions
The Marine Birds of Alijos Rocks, Mexico
Cordell Expeditions Homepage
Rocas Alijos part of Comondú municipality
Video: Tuna fishing beginning at Alijos Rocks, October 2005

Literature
Robert W. Schmieder, Ed.: Rocas Alijos: Scientific Results from the Cordell Expeditions, Dordrecht; Boston: Kluwer Academic Publishers, 1996,  (Series: Monographiae biologicae, v. 75)

Islands of Baja California Sur
Stacks (geology)
Extinct volcanoes
Volcanoes of Baja California Sur
Volcanoes of the Pacific Ocean
Comondú Municipality
Natural history of Baja California Sur
Seabird colonies
Uninhabited islands of Mexico